John Murante (born February 6, 1982) is an American politician serving as the 44th and current Nebraska State Treasurer since 2019. A member of the Republican Party, he previously was elected to the unicameral Nebraska Legislature from 2013 until 2019, representing District 49.

Education
A native of Omaha, Nebraska, Murante earned his bachelor's degree from University of Nebraska–Lincoln.

Elections
When Senator LeRoy J. Louden retired and left the District 49 seat open, Murante placed first in the May 15, 2012, primary election with 2,359 votes, and won the November 6, 2012, general election with 8,508 votes against Frank Wellenstein.

Murante ran for Treasurer of Nebraska in 2018. He defeated Taylor Royal in the Republican primary, and ran unopposed in the general election.

In September 2019, Murante helped open a satellite Treasurer's Office in Omaha to provide a location for residents to file unclaimed property claims and access other services provided by the department.

References

External links
 Official page at the Nebraska Legislature
 Campaign site
 
 Biography at Ballotpedia
 Financial information (state office) at the National Institute for Money in State Politics

 

1982 births
21st-century American politicians
Living people
Nebraska state senators
People from Sarpy County, Nebraska
Politicians from Omaha, Nebraska
State treasurers of Nebraska
University of Nebraska–Lincoln alumni